Boy Meets Boy is a 2008 South Korean short film directed by Kim Jho Kwang-soo.

It premiered at the 13th Pusan International Film Festival in 2008. It was theatrically released in South Korea on November 20, 2008.

Plot 
A short film with no spoken dialogue, Boy Meets Boy depicts the relationship between Minsu (Kim Hye Sung) and Seok-i (Lee Hyun-jin). The two come face-to-face on a bus after Minsu drops a roll of film after putting away his schoolwork into his, and to his luck it rolls to Seok-i's foot. Seok-i then picks it up and Minsu sets out to retrieve it. There is an instant spark through their silent gazes and then electric chemistry is visible when Seok-i silently returns Minsu's film. Minsu shyly walks back to discover his seat is taken by a woman who politely returns his bag, so he opts for standing until he reaches his stop. Minsu gets off the bus after it arrives at a stop, expecting Seok-i to have followed behind. However he is disappointed to discover that he was not being followed by anyone. Disappointed, he walks aimlessly and looks back once more, only to crash into Seok-i. A fairy (Ye Ji-won) appears and gives Minsu advice on love through a song. Seok-i takes off his hat and approaches Minsu, returning the latter's camera. It is revealed through flashbacks that Seok-i has in fact been following Minsu with the intention of giving him back his camera, which was stolen when Seok-i and his friends mugged him. As Seok-i walks away, Minsu runs after him and they embrace, with the fairy returning to reveal a few flashbacks of Seok-i waiting around for Minsu to return the camera, the last flashback occurring right before they both board that same bus.

Cast 
 Kim Hye-sung as Minsu
 Lee Hyun-jin as Seok-i
 Ye Ji-won as the fairy

See also 
 Just Friends?

References

External links 
  
 

2008 films
South Korean short films
South Korean romantic drama films
South Korean LGBT-related films
LGBT-related drama films
LGBT-related short films
2008 LGBT-related films
Films directed by Kim-Jho Gwangsoo
Gay-related films
2000s South Korean films